The Tōtara River is a river of the southern West Coast of New Zealand's South Island. Rising on the slopes of Bald Hill the river flows north then west to reach the Tasman Sea two kilometres north of Ross.

References

Rivers of the West Coast, New Zealand
Westland District
Rivers of New Zealand